Endodontidae is a taxonomic family of very small air-breathing land snails and slugs, terrestrial pulmonate gastropod mollusks in the superfamily Punctoidea.

This family, which includes both snails and slugs, appears to have once been much more diverse, but has declined, and is now endangered due to human activity.

Anatomy
In this family, the number of haploid chromosomes lies between 26 and 35 (according to the values in this table).

Distribution and conservation status
This family is found only in the Pacific islands. The family is critically endangered and on the verge of extinction, mainly because of habitat loss due to human development. On American Samoa, some species are in decline due to predation by introduced fire ants. On Rurutu in French Polynesia the family is only known by subfossil shells. At least 18 endemic species are known of which four were described in 2009 and eight were described as new to science in 2013. Only one of them survived into the first half of the 20th century. Most of them became extinct due to the degradation of their habitats.

Genera
The family Endodontidae has no subfamilies.

The following genera are recognised in the family Endodontidae:
 Aaadonta
 Anceyodonta
 Australdonta
 Beilania 
 Cookeconcha
 Endodonta Albers, 1850 - type genus of the family Endodontidae
 Gambiodonta
 †Hebeispira
 Kleokyphus
 Kondoconcha
 Libera
 Mautodontha
 Minidonta
 Nesodiscus
 Nesophila
 Opanara
 Orangia
 Planudonta
 Priceconcha
 †Protoendodonta
 Pseudolibera
 Rhysoconcha
 Rikitea
 Ruatara
 Taipidon
 Thaumatodon
 Zyzzyxdonta

References

External links